The 2017 Florida Atlantic Owls football team represented Florida Atlantic University in the 2017 NCAA Division I FBS football season. The Owls played their home games at the FAU Stadium in Boca Raton, Florida, and competed in the East Division of Conference USA (C–USA). They were led by first-year head coach Lane Kiffin. They finished the season 11–3, 8–0 in C-USA play to win the East Division title and represented the East Division in the Conference USA Championship Game where they defeated North Texas to be crowned C-USA champions. They were invited to the Boca Raton Bowl, where they defeated Akron.

Previous season 
The Owls finished the 2016 season 3–9, 2–6 in C-USA play to finish in a tie for last place in the East Division.

On November 27, head coach Charlie Partridge was fired. He finished at FAU with a three-year record of 9–27. On December 13, the school hired Lane Kiffin as head coach.

Schedule and results
Florida Atlantic announced its 2017 football schedule on January 26, 2017. The 2017 schedule consisted of six home and away games in the regular season. The Owls hosted two of the four non-conference opponents, Bethune–Cookman from the Mid-Eastern Athletic Conference and Navy from the American Athletic Conference and traveled to Buffalo of the Mid-American Conference and Wisconsin of the Big Ten Conference.

Schedule Source:

Game summaries

Navy

at Wisconsin

Bethune–Cookman

at Buffalo

Middle Tennessee

at Old Dominion

North Texas

at WKU

Marshall

at Louisiana Tech

FIU

at Charlotte

North Texas–C-USA Championship Game

Akron–Boca Raton Bowl

References

Florida Atlantic
Florida Atlantic Owls football seasons
Conference USA football champion seasons
Boca Raton Bowl champion seasons
Florida Atlantic Owls football